Eric Arthur Pitt  was Dean of Sydney from 1953 until 1962.
He was educated at Emmanuel College, Cambridge and  ordained in 1938. His first post was as a curate at Halliwell. Then he was  Vicar of St Matthew, Rugby from 1946 to his Dean’s appointment. After this he was the Archdeacon of (successively) Cumberland, Wollongong and Camden.

References

Alumni of Emmanuel College, Cambridge
Royal Air Force Volunteer Reserve personnel of World War II
Deans of Sydney